Face Up may refer to:

 Face Up (magazine), an Irish Catholic magazine for teenagers
 Face Up (album), an album by Lisa Stansfield
 "Face Up", a song by Lights from The Listening
 "Face Up", a song by New Order from Low-Life
 "Face Up", a song by Rush from Roll The Bones
 Supine position, a position of the body: lying down with the face up